Lecomyia is a genus of flies in the family Stratiomyidae.

Species
Lecomyia caerulea (White, 1914)
Lecomyia cyanea (White, 1916)
Lecomyia notha (Hardy, 1932)

References

Stratiomyidae
Brachycera genera
Diptera of Australasia